The 1856 Motueka and Massacre Bay by-election was a by-election held in the  electorate during the 2nd New Zealand Parliament, on 19 May 1856.

The by-election was caused by the resignation of incumbent MP Charles Parker on 15 April 1856, and was won unopposed by Herbert Curtis. It is widely believed his electoral capitulation was related to the health of his eldest daughter. He was re-elected to parliament representing Motueka and Massacre Bay.

References

Motueka 1856
1856 elections in New Zealand
Motueka